The San Diego International Film Festival is an independent film festival in San Diego, California produced by the non-profit San Diego Film Foundation. The main event has traditionally been held annually in the autumn at venues in the Gaslamp Quarter, La Jolla and Balboa Park.

The festival hosts celebrity awards banquets, panel discussions, retrospectives, parties, premieres and contemporary independent narrative, documentary and short film screenings. Competitive juried categories vary year to year and have included foreign language, animated, Native American, military, social justice, equestrian, thrillers and local films made in San Diego.

Special advanced screenings for VIP members and educational programs for San Diego area high schools are held year round in addition to an annual formal "Oscar watch party" in the winter.

History 
The San Diego International Film Festival and its non-profit foundation were founded in 2001 by event planner Robin Laatz and her filmmaker husband Karl Kozak. 
In its first decade, the festival was attended by an array of celebrities including Richard Dreyfuss, Elliott Gould, William Shatner, Tatum O'Neal, Stacey Keach, Jennifer Tilly, Mira Sorvino, Joaquin Phoenix, Jesse Eisenberg, Jenna Fischer, James Cromwell, James Van Der Beek, James Woods, Kevin Smith, Joey Lauren Adams, Melissa Joan Hart, Jason Ritter, Colin Hanks, Kim Coates, John Walsh, Scott Baio, Paul Haggis, Leland Orser, Seymour Cassel, Joan Collins, Rod Lurie, Cliff Robertson and Phyllis Diller. 

Films premiering at the festival during that time include Roger Dodger, The Blair Witch Project, Fahrenheit 9/11, An Inconvenient Truth, Waiting for Superman, Napoleon Dynamite, Primer, The Machinist and Born Into Brothels.

The festival has been designated "Best Party Fest" and "Best Beach Fest" by the "Ultimate Film Festival Survival Guide." It has also been criticized along the same lines for being "more intent on throwing parties than putting quality films on the screen."

New Leadership/Native Direction 
In 2012, leadership passed to husband and wife producers Dale Strack and Tonya Mantooth. According to Strack: "we’re modeling it after the Napa Valley Film Festival,” he said. “But the longer term goal is to have it rival Sundance or TriBeCa.”

The festival expanded to a second location in La Jolla the same year.

Another new change was the establishment of a "Native American Advisory Board," whose name was changed in 2017 to "American Indian Advisory Board." Tribes represented on the AIA board include Sac and Fox, Luiseño, Kumeyaay, Seminole, Lipan/Mescalero Apache and the Barona Band of Mission Indians. Notable members of the board include character actor Saginaw Grant (The Lone Ranger, Breaking Bad), Randolph Mantooth (Emergency!, Sons of Anarchy, brother of Tonya) and Erica Pinto, the Chairwoman of Jamul Indian Village.

2012-2019 
Notable attendees during this period include Gus Van Sant, Robin Williams, Ben Affleck, Anne Heche, Diane Ladd, Judd Apatow, Michael B. Jordan, Martin McDonagh, Mariel Hemingway, Troy Duffy, Alan Arkin, Beau Bridges, Michele Monaghan, Eli Roth, Tom Berenger, Josh Duhamel, Dennis Haysbert, Geena Davis, Adrien Brody, Brit Marling, John Boyega, Jack Robbins, Jason Segel, Annette Bening, Warren Beatty, Simon Helberg, Kevin Pollak, JJ Totah, Sean Patrick Flanery, Kweku Mandela, Kate Beckinsale, Jason Mitchell, Rian Johnson, Anne Heche, Patrick Stewart, Kumail Nanjiani, Heather Graham, Blake Jenner, Bill Hader, Henry Winkler, JK Simmons, Keith Carradine, Kenny Loggins, Topher Grace, Kathryn Hahn, Zachary Levi, John Cho, Alex Wolff, Nat Wolff, Christian Navarro, Hal Linden, Gavin Hood, Laurence Fishburne, Lindsay Wagner, Jared Harris, Jillian Bell, Camila Morrone and Stephen Gyllenhaal. 

Notable films premiering at the festival during this time include Silver Linings Playbook, 12 Years a Slave, He Named Me Malala, Goosebumps, The Imitation Game, Wild, Lion, Tiger, Three Billboards Outside Ebbing, Missouri, Call Me By Your Name, Marshall, The Favourite, Widows, Boy Erased, Jojo Rabbit, Portrait of a Lady on Fire, Marriage Story, The Irishman, and Parasite. 

In 2013, New York area film critic Jeffrey Lyons was added as festival host and made honorary jury chairman. He acted as host or co-host, with son Ben Lyons or Access Hollywood film critic Scott Mantz until 2018, when Mantz hosted solo.

The festival added 'International' to its name in 2016, having previously been known only as the San Diego Film Festival.

In 2016, the festival established a Film Insider Series for VIP members to watch featured official selections and festival winners, premieres and special advanced screenings throughout the year.

In September 2019, the festival began hosting free popular movies (Back to the Future, Men In Black) on Mission Beach.

In 2019, the festival expanded to six days and hosted a second opening night film (The Irishman) at the La Jolla Village.

2020-present 
Notable films premiering at the festival during this time include Nomadland, The French Dispatch, Spencer, The Power of the Dog, The Lost Daughter, The Banshees of Inisherin and The Inspection.

In 2020, due to the COVID-19 pandemic the festival was reduced back to four days and presented 114 films both virtually and on drive-thru screens.

As of 2020, the San Diego International Film Festival is a qualifying festival for the Canadian Screen Awards.

In 2021, limited in-person screenings resumed at new venues including the Museum of Photographic Arts and the San Diego Museum of Art in Balboa Park, as well as the Catamaran Resort in Mission Bay. A special screening was held on the deck on a historic aircraft carrier at the USS Midway Museum.

In 2022, after organizers at the Women's Museum of California's had ended their Women's Film Festival due to the COVID-19 pandemic, they joined forces with the San Diego Festival to present a women's series of films.

Awards

Gregory Peck Award 
The Gregory Peck Award for Cinematic Excellence has been presented by the family of San Diego native Gregory Peck at the festival since 2014. Recipients at the San Diego festival include Andy Garcia, Laurence Fishburne, Keith Carradine, Patrick Stewart, Annette Bening and Alan Arkin.  The family originally presented the award at the Dingle International Film Festival in Ireland. Previous recipients include Gabriel Byrne, Jim Sheridan, Jean-Jacques Beineix and Laura Dern.

Chris Brinker Award 
Created by the family of Chris Brinker, a San Diego area producer best known for The Boondock Saints movies who died of a brain aneurysm at the age of 42. The award is given every year to the best first time director in competition at the festival.

Golden Eagle 
Since 2014, honored celebrities and winning filmmakers have been presented with a "Golden Eagle" themed statuette, sculpted by Apache artist Ruben Chato.

Kumeyaay Eagle Award 

An annual award presented to the best film competing in the American Indian track.

Night of the Stars Awards

The festival offers other awards - Auteur, Vanguard, Humanitarian, Rising Star, etc. - that vary year to year. Honorees since 2012 have included:

2022: Regina Hall, Tony Hale, Lisa Ann Walker, Colson Baker.
2019: Lindsay Wagner, Jared Harris, Pitbull, Jillian Bell, Camilla Morrone.
2018: Kenny Loggins, Kathryn Hahn, John Cho, Topher Grace, Zachary Levi, Alex Wolff, Christian Navarro.
 2017: Kumail Nanjiani, Heather Graham, Taran Killam and Blake Jenner.
 2017: Kate Beckinsale, Simon Helberg and Jason Mitchell
 2016: Adrien Brody, Geena Davis, Brit Marling and John Boyega
 2015: Beau Bridges, Michelle Monaghan, Eli Roth, Allison Pill, Tom Berenger
 2014: Judd Apatow, Michael B. Jordan and Mariel Hemingway
2013: Gus Van Sant, Diane Ladd, Anne Heche, Penny Lane, Stephen Gyllenhaal and Martin McDonagh.

Gala Event Films

Partnerships 

48 Hour Film Project winners and nominees from San Diego are screened during the festival every year.

The San Diego International Film Festival has partnered with the San Diego County Office of Education and the San Diego Unified School District to bring films about social issues like homelessness, water pollution and refugees to area high schools.

The festival submits films - along with the GI Film Festival, FilmOut San Diego, San Diego Asian Film Festival, San Diego Latino Film Festival, Horrible Imaginings Film Festival -  to San Diego Film Week , a city-wide spring showcase produced by Film Consortium San Diego.  Submitted films are eligible to win San Diego Film Awards.

Film Insider Series 
Special screenings of official selections premieres and advanced screenings are held monthly for VIP members throughout the year.

See also 

 San Diego Asian Film Festival
 San Diego Jewish Film Festival
 San Diego Black Film Festival
 GI Film Festival
 Oceanside International Film Festival
 San Diego Film Critics Society
 San Diego Comic-Con

References

External links 
 Official Site
 Imdb Page
Facebook / Twitter / Instagram 
YouTube / Vimeo

Film festivals in San Diego
Film festivals established in 2001
Annual events in California